Major General Ubaya Medawela RSP, VSV, USP, ndu, psc, MSc was a Sri Lankan senior army officer; he was the Chief of Staff of the Sri Lanka Army.

Education
Ubaya received his education from Nalanda College Colombo (where he was a Senior Cadet) alongside peers such as Air Chief Marshal Gagan Bulathsinghala, Major General Ajith Wickramasinghe, Udaya Ranawaka and former Sri Lanka test cricketer Sanath Kaluperuma. He is a graduate of the New Zealand Defence College and the University of Madras, holding a MSc in Defence and Strategic Studies with an Instructor Grading.

Military career

Ubaya has also been military attaché in the Sri Lankan mission to the United Nations in New York, and the army's Security Force Commander (Central & West) and a military spokesman.

References

 
 
 
 Damages caused by recent riots Rs 400 M – Azath Salley
 Rajitha’s Lone Battle Against BBS
 Share, Like And Honor Our Heroes! CHAMPIONS AT HERMAN LOOSE CAMP '13 Nalanda College, Colombo, Sri Lanka

Sri Lankan Buddhists
Sri Lankan major generals
Sinhalese military personnel
Alumni of Nalanda College, Colombo
Sri Lanka Military Academy graduates
Sri Lanka Armoured Corps officers